Tavakachevo (Täwäkäs) is a rural locality (a village) and the administrative center of Tavakachevsky Selsoviet, Arkhangelsky District, Bashkortostan, Russia. The population was 594 as of 2010. There are 10 streets.

Geography 
Tavakachevo is located 7 km north of Arkhangelskoye (the district's administrative centre) by road. Priuralye is the nearest rural locality.

References 

Rural localities in Arkhangelsky District